= Prime Minister Gandhi =

Prime Minister Gandhi may refer to:

- Indira Gandhi, 3rd Prime Minister of India between 1966–1977 and 1980–1984
- Rajiv Gandhi, 6th Prime Minister of India from 1984 to 1989, son of Indira Gandhi
